Events in the year 1858 in Japan.

Incumbents

Events
 Ichikawa Kumehachi make her stage debut as the first actress to appear on stage in Japan since actresses were banned in 1629.

Incumbents
Monarch: Kōmei

Births
January 25 - Mikimoto Kōkichi (d. 1954), businessman

Deaths

References

 
1850s in Japan
Japan
Years of the 19th century in Japan